The Vengeance of Fu Manchu is a 1967 British crime thriller adventure film directed by Jeremy Summers and starring Christopher Lee, Horst Frank, Douglas Wilmer and Tsai Chin. It was the third British/West German Constantin Film co-production of the Dr. Fu Manchu series and the first to be filmed in Hong Kong at the renowned Shaw Brothers studio. It was generally released in the U.K. through Warner-Pathé (as the second half of a double feature with the Lindsay Shonteff film The Million Eyes of Sumuru) on 3 December 1967.

Cast
Credits adapted from the booklet of the Powerhouse Films Blu-ray boxset The Fu Manchu Cycle: 1965-1969.

Christopher Lee as Fu Manchu
Douglas Wilmer as Nayland Smith
Tsai Chin as Lin Tang
Horst Frank as Rudy
Noel Trevarthen as Mark Weston
Maria Rohm as Ingrid Swenson
Tony Ferrer as Inspector Ramos
Peter Carsten as Kurt
Wolfgang Kieling as Dr. Lieberson
Suzanne Roquette as Maria
Howard Marion-Crawford as Dr. Petrie
Mona Chong as Jasmin
Eddie Byrne as Ship's Captain

References

External links

 
 

1967 films
1967 adventure films
1960s crime thriller films
British adventure films
British crime thriller films
West German films
1960s English-language films
English-language German films
Films directed by Jeremy Summers
Films scored by Malcolm Lockyer
Films set in the 1920s
Films shot in Hong Kong
Fu Manchu films
1960s British films